Marcel Dries (19 September 1929 – 27 September 2011) was a Belgian international footballer who played as a defender.

Career
Born in Antwerp, Dries played club football for Berchem Sport, Union Saint-Gilloise and KV Kortrijk.

He earned a total of 31 caps for Belgium between 1953 and 1959, and participated at the 1954 FIFA World Cup.

References

1929 births
2011 deaths
Belgian footballers
Belgium international footballers
1954 FIFA World Cup players
K. Berchem Sport players
K.V. Kortrijk players
Association football defenders